Many men among the aviators of the Austro-Hungarian Luftfahrtruppen were of the Slovak ethnic minority, living in what was then part of the Kingdom of Hungary. Austria-Hungary was a constitutional union of the Austrian Empire (Cisleithania) and the Kingdom of Hungary (Transleithania) which existed from 1867 to 1918, when it collapsed as a result of defeat in World War I. The aces listed below either were born in present-day Slovak Republic, were of Slovak ethnic identity, or both.

See also
 Flying ace
 List of World War I flying aces
 List of World War I flying aces from Austria-Hungary
 List of World War I aces credited with 15–19 victories
 List of World War I aces credited with 9 victories
 List of World War I  aces credited with 8 victories
 List of World War I aces credited with 7 victories
 List of World War I aces credited with 5 victories

References

Austro-Hungarian World War I flying aces
Slovak aviators
Slovak
World War I flying aces
Austro-Hungarian Air Service personnel